The Capital Geographic Union is the Geographical Union (GU) for rugby union teams playing in Maryland, Virginia and Washington, D.C. It is an association of youth, high school, collegiate, and adult men's and women's rugby teams in the Mid-Atlantic United States under USA Rugby.

Clubs

Men's

Division 1 
Baltimore-Chesapeake Brumbies

Norfolk Blues

Northern Virginia Rugby Football Club

Pittsburgh Harlequins

Potomac Exiles Rugby Club

Rocky Gorge RFC

Washington Irish RFC

Division 2 
James River

Richmond Lions Rugby Club

Washington Rugby Football Club

West Potomac Rugby Football Club

Virginia Rugby Football Club

Division 3 
Baltimore-Chesapeake Brumbies D3

Blacksburg RFC

Blackwater RFC

Frederick Rugby

Newport News Rugby Football Club

Norfolk Blues D3

North Bay

Northern Virginia Rugby Football Club D3

Rappahannock Golden Boars

Roanoke RFC

Rocktown Rugby

Rocky Gorge RFC D3

Severn River Rugby

Virginia Beach Falcons RFC

Washington Irish RFC D3

Washington Renegades

Division 4 
Blue Ridge Rugby Football Club

Eastern Bay Rugby Football Club

Prince William County RFC

Quantico Hooligans

Washington Scandals Rugby Football Club

Western Suburbs RFC

Women's

Division 1 
Northern Virginia Rugby Football Club

Raleigh Venom

Washington Women's Rugby Football Club, the DC Furies

Division 2 
James River

Norfolk Storm Women's Rugby

Pittsburgh Angels Women's Rugby Club

Severn River Women's Rugby

Chesapeake Rugby

Division 3 
DC Revolution

Frederick Rugby

Maryland Stingers

Northern Virginia Rugby Football Club D3

Rappahannock Women's Rugby Football Club

Roanoke RFC

See also
Rugby union in the United States

References

External links
USA Rugby Official Site
IRB Official Site

Rugby union governing bodies in the United States